Louis Randavel (1869, Bône - 1947, Douéra) was a French-Algerian Orientalist painter.

Biography 
His family was originally from Nîmes. As a young man, he went to Paris, where he studied drawing, later serving as a teacher of that subject.

Following World War I, he became a professor in Philippeville (now known as Skikda), then in Constantine. At that time, he visited Kabylie and would come to spend much of his spare time there, painting landscapes.

After retiring, in 1929, he moved to Douéra, in the Algerian Sahel, and continued to paint Orientalist-themed scenes.

His early work shows the influence of Jean-Baptiste-Camille Corot.

Sources 
 Marion Vidal Bué, L'Algérie et ses peintres, Éditions Paris-Méditerranée, Paris, Alger, 2002,  
 Victor Barrucand, L'Algérie et les peintres Orientaliste, Éditions du Tell, 2005, 
 Élizabeth Cazenave, Dictionnaire des peintres d'Algérie, Éditions de l'Onde, 2010,

External links 

More works by Randavel @ ArtNet

1869 births
1947 deaths
19th-century French painters
French landscape painters
French orientalists
French Algeria
People from Annaba
20th-century French painters